The Consulate-General of the Russian Federation in Houston General'noe konsul'stvo Rossiyskoy Federatsii v Kh'yustone) is Russia's diplomatic office in Houston, Texas, United States. It is located in Suite 1300 at Park Towers South.

The facility serves Alabama, Arkansas, Kansas, Louisiana, Mississippi, Missouri, Oklahoma, and Texas. As of 2017 the consul general is Alexander Borisovich Pisarev.

History

In October 2001 the U.S. and Russia formally agreed to establish a Houston consulate. The Russian government approved the establishment on February 12, 2003. On May 9 of that year the United States Department of State confirmed the appointment of the consul general. The facility opened on August 4, 2004.

Russia opened a consulate in Houston due to the proximity to aerospace and petroleum industries. In a 2004 Houston Chronicle article Nikolai V. Sofinskiy, the first consul general, stated that the Houston area had around 40,000 Russian speakers and that Houston's consulate could easily serve the southeastern United States.

Consuls-General of Russia in Houston
 2003—2008  Nikolay Vsevolodovich Sofinskiy (born 10 February 1958)
 2008—2011  Nikolay Yevgenyevich Babich (born 22 December 1948)
 2011—2017  Alexander Konstantinovich Zakharov (born 18 February 1960)
 2017June 2020  Alexander Borisovich Pisarev (born 16 May 1956)
 June 2020present  Alexander Konstantinovich Zakharov began his second term as Consul General of Russian Federation in Houston, Texas(www.mid.ru/activity/new appointments)

Gallery

See also

 Diplomatic missions of Russia

References

External links

Consulate-General of the Russian Federation in Houston

2001 establishments in Texas
Houston
Russia
Russia–United States relations